Alforjas is an extinct genus of camelid, endemic to North America.

Alforjas is Spanish for the saddle bags used on domestic llamas. The name has a regional association with the meaning of humps or lumps. Alforjas differs from Pleiolama, Hemiauchenia, Palaeolama, and Lama in its greater height of crown, larger size, and longer snout.

The range of the Alforjas include the Mexican states of Zacatecas and Guanajauto, and the U.S. states of Oregon, California, Nevada, Idaho, Arizona, New Mexico, Texas, Oklahoma, Colorado, Kansas, and Nebraska.

References 

Prehistoric camelids
Prehistoric even-toed ungulate genera
Miocene even-toed ungulates
Pliocene even-toed ungulates
Prehistoric mammals of North America
Fossil taxa described in 1979